The 1983–84 Edmonton Oilers season was the Oilers' fifth season in the NHL. After an outstanding regular season, the Oilers won their first Stanley Cup.

Regular season
It was another record breaking season for the club. The Oilers set club records in wins (57) and points (119), as they won the Smythe Division for the 3rd straight season. Edmonton broke the NHL record for goals in a season, set by the Oilers the previous season, by scoring 446 times.

The Oilers got off to a strong start, winning 39 of their first 53 games. Wayne Gretzky started strong too, scoring a point or more in the first fifty-one games. After failing to score in the fifty-second, he missed six straight games along with Jari Kurri. After winning their first game without Gretzky and Kurri, the Oilers lost five in a row, including an 11-0 loss to the Hartford Whalers on Sunday, February 12, 1984. It was the first time in 230 consecutive regular-season games that the Oilers were shut out; the last time Edmonton had been shut out was on Thursday, March 12, 1981, when they lost at home, 5–0, to the New York Islanders. But, after a lecture from coach Glen Sather, and the return of Gretzky and Kurri, the Oilers won eight in a row and finished the season first overall in the NHL.

Wayne Gretzky broke the 200 point barrier for the second time in his career, as he won the Art Ross Trophy for the 4th straight year with 205 points. Gretzky scored an NHL high 87 goals and 118 assists. Paul Coffey would put up 126 points, the 2nd highest point total ever by a defenceman, while Jari Kurri (113) and Mark Messier (101) each broke the 100 point mark for the club. Glenn Anderson had a solid season, getting 54 goals, behind only Gretzky, and just miss the 100-point club as he finished with 99.

Grant Fuhr led the club with 30 victories, while Andy Moog put up a team best GAA of 3.77.

Season standings

Schedule and results

Playoffs
In the playoffs, the Oilers made short work of the Winnipeg Jets, sweeping them in 3 games, and then faced their Battle of Alberta rivals, the Calgary Flames for the Smythe Division finals. The Flames pushed the Oilers to 7 games before Edmonton defeated them for the 2nd straight year.  The Oilers swept the Minnesota North Stars in the Campbell Conference final, setting up a Stanley Cup rematch against the New York Islanders. The Islanders, who swept the Oilers the previous year, were looking to win their 5th straight Stanley Cup.  Edmonton, however, had other plans, and after the teams split the first 2 games in New York, the Oilers won 3 in a row at home to win the series in 5 games, becoming the first team from the WHA to win the Stanley Cup. Mark Messier won the Conn Smythe Trophy as the playoff MVP.

Player statistics

Regular season
Scoring leaders

Goaltending

Playoffs
Scoring leaders

Goaltending

Awards and Records

Awards

Records
 446: An NHL team record for most goals in a single season.
425: A new NHL team record for most goals in a single season on March 21, 1984.
 12: An NHL record for most short-handed goals in a single season by Wayne Gretzky.
11: A new NHL record for most short-handed goals in a single season by Wayne Gretzky on February 15, 1984.

Milestones

Transactions

Trades

Free agents

Draft picks
Edmonton's draft picks at the 1983 NHL Entry Draft

References

External links
 SHRP Sports
 National Hockey League Guide & Record Book 2007

Edmonton Oilers season, 1983-84
Edmonton Oilers season, 1983-84
Edmon
Edmonton Oilers seasons
Smythe Division champion seasons
Stanley Cup championship seasons
Western Conference (NHL) championship seasons